Fekry Pasha Abaza (1895 – 9 February 1979) was an Egyptian journalist and democratic political activist.

Early life and education
Abaza was born in 1895 in the village of Kafr Abu Shehata in the East, Egypt. He was a member of the Abaza Family. He was one of the first graduates of faculty of commerce at Cairo University.

Career
Abaza began his journalism career by writing for the newspaper Al-Maiied, and then for the newspaper Al-Ahram in 1919. He joined the National Democratic Party in 1921. Afterward, he served as an editor for the magazine Al-Musawar for two years before being promoted to editor in chief in 1926. He worked for the magazine until 1961 and occupied the position of chief editor of the monthly Egyptian magazine Al-Hilal (Crescent) for several of those years. On 18 August 1961, the  Egyptian government decided to relieve him from his duties, and said that the order was made by President Gamal Abdel Nasser, as a result of a political article he allowed to be published. From 1944 until being relieved as editor in chief, he was elected as a syndicate chairman for journalism over four consecutive election cycles.

Later life and death
Abaza was elected Honorary President of the Egyptian football club Al Ahly and a member of the Supreme Council of the Egyptian National Library, receiving an honorary doctorate degree from the Academy of Arts. Abaza was also an amateur musician, with a talent for playing the flute and mandolin. He also wrote a number of stories, including Khalaf El Habayeb, Aldahek Albaky and Ahadeeth Fekry Abaza. He died in Cairo on 9 February 1979.

See also
Abaza family
Ottoman titles

References

External links
 Egypt in the Reign of Muhammad Ali

20th-century Egyptian politicians
20th-century journalists
1895 births
1979 deaths
Egyptian people of Circassian descent
Egyptian people of Abkhazian descent
Egyptian pashas
Egyptian royalty
Egyptian activists
Egyptian journalists
National Democratic Party (Egypt) politicians
Cairo University alumni